Spring Mills Historic District is a national historic district located near Martinsburg, Berkeley County, West Virginia. It encompasses five contributing buildings, constructed between about 1790 and 1922, and two contributing sites.  They include the Falling Waters Presbyterian Church (1834) and Manse (1922) and Stephen Hammond Mill (c. 1790), Miller's House (c. 1790), and Spring House (c. 1800).  The buildings are of masonry construction.  The sites are the Falling Waters Presbyterian Church Cemetery and the site of Dr. Allen Hammonds House.

It was listed on the National Register of Historic Places in 2004.

References

Historic districts in Berkeley County, West Virginia
Historic districts on the National Register of Historic Places in West Virginia
Historic districts in Martinsburg, West Virginia
2004 establishments in West Virginia